Henriëtte Gesina Numans (15 August 1877 – 11 May 1955) was a Dutch painter.

Numans was born in Sintang Regency. She was trained in The Hague at the drawing school there in 1899–1900. She married the painter Waalko Jans Dingemans and they lived first in the Hague, in Nieuwkoop 1904–1911, and later in Haarlem, where he died in 1925. Henriette taught drawing at a school for girls and was a member of Kunst Zij Ons Doel there and Arti et Amicitiae in Amsterdam. Numans' work was included in the 1939 exhibition and sale Onze Kunst van Heden (Our Art of Today) at the Rijksmuseum in Amsterdam.

Numans died in Zeist.

References

External links
Henriette Gisma Dingeman-Numans (1877–1955) on Artnet
Henrietta Gesina Dingemans-Numans (Dutch, 1877–1955) on Artnet

1877 births
1955 deaths
Artists from Haarlem
Dutch women painters
Flower artists
20th-century Dutch painters
20th-century Dutch women artists
Dutch people of the Dutch East Indies